

Explorations

Excavations
 March 16: Arthur Evans purchases Knossos and soon after begins excavations.
 Excavations by Friedrich Delitzsch begin at Assur.
 University of Pennsylvania excavations at Nippur conclude (began in 1888).
 Gordium excavated by Gustav and Alfred Körte.
 Kavousi excavated by Harriet Boyd.
 Villa Boscoreale, near Pompeii, excavated.
 Excavations at Hedeby in Jutland begin.

Publications

Finds
 April 5: A large cache of clay tablets with a script used for writing Mycenaean Greek, now known as Linear B, is found at Knossos.
 May: Migdale Hoard of early Bronze Age jewellery discovered near Bonar Bridge in Scotland.
 October: Greek sponge divers discover the Antikythera wreck.
 Dr. James K. Hampson documents find of the Island 35 Mastodon skeleton in the Mississippi River.
 Site of Temple of Eshmun discovered in Lebanon.

Awards

Miscellaneous

Births
 May 2 – A. W. Lawrence, English Classical archaeologist (d. 1991).
 May 23 – Gustav Riek, German archaeologist (d. 1976).
 August 18 – Glenn Albert Black, American archaeologist (d. 1964).
 August 19 – Dorothy Burr Thompson, American archaeologist and art historian (d. 2001).

Deaths
 May 4 – Augustus Pitt Rivers, English ethnologist and archaeologist (b. 1827).
 May 18 – Félix Ravaisson-Mollien, French philosopher and archaeologist (b. 1813).

See also
 List of years in archaeology
 1899 in archaeology
 1901 in archaeology

References

Archaeology, 1900 In
Archaeology by year
1900s in science
Archaeology, 1900 In